Kenrick Bainey (born 16 November 1955) is a Trinidadian cricketer. He played in 35 first-class and 5 List A matches for Trinidad and Tobago from 1974 to 1985.

See also
 List of Trinidadian representative cricketers

References

External links
 

1955 births
Living people
Trinidad and Tobago cricketers